The average wage is a measure of total income after taxes divided by total number of employees employed. In this article, the average wage is adjusted for living expenses "purchasing power parity" (PPP). This is not to be confused with the average income which is a measure of total income including wage, investment benefit, and other capital gains divided by total number of people in the population including non-working residents. Average wages can differ from median wages; for example, the Social Security Administration estimated that the 2020 average wage in the United States was $53,383, while the 2020 median wage was $34,612.

OECD statistics
The OECD (Organization for Economic Co-operation and Development) dataset contains data on average annual wages for full-time and full-year equivalent employees in the total economy. Average annual wages per full-time equivalent dependent employee are obtained by dividing the national-accounts-based total wage bill by the average number of employees in the total economy, which is then multiplied by the ratio of average usual weekly hours per full-time employee to average usually weekly hours for all employees.

* Indicates "Economy of [country or territory]" links.

UNECE statistics
The gross average monthly wage estimates for 2017 are computed by converting national currency figures from the UNECE (United Nations Economic Commission for Europe) Statistical Database, compiled from national and international (OECD, EUROSTAT, CIS) official sources. Wages in US dollars  are computed by the UNECE Secretariat using purchasing-power-parity dollars.

Gross average monthly wages cover total wages and salaries in cash and in kind, before any tax deduction and before social security contributions. They include wages and salaries, remuneration for time not worked, bonuses and gratuities paid by the employer to the employee. Wages cover the total economy and are expressed per full-time equivalent employee.

* Indicates "Economy of [country or territory]" links.

See also
Disposable household and per capita income
Wages and salaries
Personal income in the United States
List of countries by average annual labor hours
List of countries by GDP (nominal) per capita
List of countries by labour productivity
List of countries by minimum wage
List of European countries by average wage

References

External links
GDP per capita by country Interactive GDP chart that allows filtering by various national groupings (such as NATO, EU, BRIC, ASEAN etc.)

Average Wage
Wage
 List
Average wage